Santiago Dam (also known as Santiago Creek Dam) is an earth/rockfill dam across Santiago Creek in Orange County, in the U.S. state of California, forming Irvine Lake. The  earth dam and its reservoir serve for flood control and recreational purposes. It lies upstream (southeast) from the city of Orange and north of Irvine. Irvine Lake is the largest body of fresh water entirely in Orange County.

History
Construction on the dam started in 1929 with a joint venture by the Irvine Company and Serrano Irrigation District. After the site was graded, the dam was built using dirt and rock excavated from the sides of the canyon and from the streambed both above and below the dam site. The structure was completed in 1931 at a cost of $1 million, and its reservoir, Irvine Lake, filled by 1933. In the late 1930s, the lake was stocked with fish, and was opened to the public for recreational use in 1941.

The dam was built to serve the purpose of flood control, irrigation and municipal water use. With heavy suburban sprawl downstream encroaching since the 1960s, agriculture along lower Santiago Creek has practically ceased. It is currently owned by the Irvine Ranch Water District and the Serrano Water District (the former Serrano Irrigation District). Today the dam marks the usual ending point of surface flow in Santiago Creek, as all the discharge is retained in the reservoir and downstream flow is limited to seepage and stormwater.

Statistics
This spillway has only been used a few times, such as the floods of 1938, 1969, 1983, 1998 and 2005.

This reservoir is not only the largest man-made lake in Orange County, but is also the largest body of fresh water entirely in the county. A fishing license is not required.

The dam and reservoir receive water from a catchment area totaling , controlling water from about two-thirds of the Santiago Creek watershed. Aside from Santiago Creek, Limestone Wash and various unnamed streams flow into the reservoir. Upstream tributaries of Santiago Creek include Silverado and Modjeska Creeks. Villa Park is designed to stay dry during normal weather conditions and hold back most flood releases from the Santiago Dam.

See also
List of dams and reservoirs in California

References

Dams in California
United States local public utility dams
Dams completed in 1931